Steven Kavuma is a Ugandan judge and the immediate former deputy chief justice of Uganda. He was appointed to that post on 5 March 2015. From April 2013 until March 2015, he served as the acting Chief Justice of Uganda, pending the appointment of a substantive Chief Justice by the President of Uganda. However, the way Uganda's judiciary is configured, the Deputy Chief Justice is not a member of the Supreme Court of Uganda, but is a member of the Court of Appeal of Uganda.

Background and education
He was born in Central Uganda on 28 September 1947. He studied law at Makerere University, Uganda's oldest and largest public university, graduating with the degree of Bachelor of Laws. He also holds a Diploma in Legal practice, obtained from the Law Development Centre in Kampala, Uganda's capital and largest city.

Career
In the early 2000s, Steven Kavuma served as the State Minister for Defence. He was appointed to the Uganda High Court following the 2006 national elections. When Benjamin Odoki stepped down as the Chief Justice, Justice Kavuma was appointed Acting Chief Justice, from April 2013 until March 2015.

See also
Alfonse Owiny-Dollo
Judiciary of Uganda
Parliament of Uganda
Cabinet of Uganda

References

External links
Uganda Law Society Contest Kavuma’s New Post

20th-century Ugandan lawyers
21st-century Ugandan judges
1947 births
Living people
Ganda people
Law Development Centre alumni
Makerere University alumni
Deputy Chief Justices of Uganda
Justices of the Court of Appeal of Uganda
21st-century Ugandan politicians